Michael Landon (born Eugene Maurice Orowitz; October 31, 1936 – July 1, 1991) was an American actor and filmmaker. He is known for his roles as Little Joe Cartwright in Bonanza (1959–1973), Charles Ingalls in Little House on the Prairie (1974–1983), and Jonathan Smith in Highway to Heaven (1984–1989). Landon appeared on the cover of TV Guide 22 times, second only to Lucille Ball.

Early life
Landon was born Eugene Maurice Orowitz on October 31, 1936, in Forest Hills, a neighborhood of Queens, New York. His parents were Peggy (née O'Neill; a dancer and comedian) and Eli Maurice Orowitz. His father was Jewish, and his mother was Roman Catholic. Eugene was the Orowitz family's second child; their daughter, Evelyn, was born three years earlier, in 1933. In 1941, when Landon was 4, he and his family moved to the borough of Collingswood, New Jersey. He attended, and celebrated his bar mitzvah at Temple Beth Sholom. His family recalls that Landon "went through a lot of hassle studying for the big event, which included bicycling to a nearby town every day in order to learn how to read Hebrew and recite prayers."

During his childhood, Landon was constantly worrying about his mother attempting suicide. On a family beach vacation, his mother tried to drown herself, but Landon rescued her. Shortly after the attempt, his mother acted as if nothing happened, and a few minutes later, he vomited. He said that it was the worst experience of his life. Stress overload from the suicide attempts of his mother caused Landon to battle the childhood problem of bedwetting, which was documented in the unauthorized biography Michael Landon: His Triumph and Tragedy. His mother put his wet sheets on display outside his window for all to see. He ran home every day and tried to remove them before his classmates could see. These experiences were incorporated into his semi-autobiographical television movie, The Loneliest Runner, which he wrote, produced and directed.
 
Landon attended Collingswood High School and was an excellent javelin thrower, with his  toss in 1954 being the longest throw by a high schooler in the United States that year. This earned him an athletic scholarship to the University of Southern California, but he subsequently tore his shoulder ligaments, putting an end to his days as a college athlete and as a student. Landon considered show business and served as an attendant at a service gas station opposite the studios of Warner Bros. He was eventually noticed by Bob Raison, a local agent. Following advice, Landon changed his surname, selecting a new one from a phone book.

Career

Early work
Landon's first starring appearance was on the television series Telephone Time, in the episode "The Mystery of Casper Hauser" (1956) as the title character. Other parts came: movie roles in I Was a Teenage Werewolf (1957), Maracaibo (1958), High School Confidential (1958), the notorious God's Little Acre (1958), and The Legend of Tom Dooley (1959), as well as many roles on television, such as Crossroads (three episodes), The Restless Gun (pilot episode aired on Schlitz Playhouse of Stars), Sheriff of Cochise (in "Human Bomb"), U.S. Marshal (as Don Sayers in "The Champ"), Crusader, Frontier Doctor, The Rifleman (in "End of a Young Gun", 1958), The Adventures of Jim Bowie, Johnny Staccato, Wire Service, General Electric Theater, The Court of Last Resort, State Trooper (two episodes), Tales of Wells Fargo (three episodes), The Texan (in the 1958 episode "The Hemp Tree"), The Tall Man, Tombstone Territory (in the episodes "The Man From Brewster", with John Carradine and "Rose of the Rio Bravo", with Kathleen Nolan), Trackdown (two 1958 episodes), and Wanted Dead or Alive, starring Steve McQueen (in episodes "The Martin Poster", 1958, and "The Legend", 1959). Landon also appeared in at least 2 episodes of Dick Powell's Zane Grey Theater including "Gift from a Gunman" in 1957 and "Living is a Lonely Thing" in 1959. Landon can be seen in two uncredited speaking roles as a cavalry trooper in a 1956 episode of the ABC/Warner Bros. television series Cheyenne, an episode titled "Decision." Two years later, Landon returned to that same series as White Hawk in "The White Warrior".

Bonanza

In 1959, at the age of 22, Landon began his first starring TV role as Little Joe Cartwright on Bonanza, one of the first TV series to be broadcast in color. Also starring on the show were Lorne Greene, Pernell Roberts, and Dan Blocker. During Bonanzas sixth season (1964–1965), the show topped the Nielsen ratings and remained number one for three years.

Receiving more fan mail than any other cast member, Landon negotiated with executive producer David Dortort and NBC to write and direct some episodes. In 1962, Landon wrote his first script. In 1968, Landon directed his first episode. In 1993, TV Guide listed Little Joe's September 1972 two-hour wedding episode ("Forever") as one of TV's most memorable specials. Landon's script recalled Little Joe's brother, Hoss, who was initially the story's groom, before Dan Blocker's death. During the final season, the ratings declined, and NBC canceled Bonanza in November 1972. The last episode aired on January 16, 1973.

Along with Lorne Greene and Victor Sen Yung, Landon appeared in all 14 seasons of the series. Landon was loyal to many of his Bonanza associates including producer Kent McCray, director William F. Claxton, and composer David Rose, who remained with him throughout Bonanza as well as Little House on the Prairie and Highway to Heaven.

Little House on the Prairie

The year after Bonanza was canceled, Landon went on to star as Charles Ingalls in the pilot of what became another successful television series, Little House on the Prairie, again for NBC. The show was taken from a 1935 book written by Laura Ingalls Wilder, whose character in the show was played by 9-year-old actress Melissa Gilbert. In addition to Gilbert, two other unknown actresses also starred on the show: Melissa Sue Anderson, who appeared as Mary Ingalls, the oldest daughter in the Ingalls family, and Karen Grassle as Charles' wife, Caroline. Landon served as executive producer, writer, and director of Little House.

The show was nominated for several Emmy and Golden Globe awards. After eight seasons, Little House was retooled by NBC in 1982 as Little House: A New Beginning, which focused on the Wilder family and the Walnut Grove community. Though Landon remained the show's executive producer, director and writer, A New Beginning did not feature Charles and Caroline Ingalls. A New Beginning was actually the final chapter of Little House, as the series ended in 1983. The following year, three made-for-television movies aired.

Melissa Gilbert said of her on- and off-screen chemistry with Landon, "He was very much like a 'second father' to me. My own father passed away when I was 11, so, without really officially announcing it, Michael really stepped in." When not working on the Little House set, Gilbert spent most of the weekends visiting Landon's real-life family. She once said, "The house was huge. We ran like banshees through that house, and Mike would hide behind doorways and jump out and scare us." 

In a 2015 interview, Gilbert said of Landon, "He gave me so much advice...the overall idea that he pounded into me, from a little girl, into my brain was that nothing's more important than 'Home & Family'; no success, no career, no achievements, no accomplishments, nothing's more important than loving the people you love and contributing to a community. Though we were working, really, really hard, we were 'Not Saving The World', one episode of television at a time, we're just entertaining people and there are more important things to do... and have fun; no matter what."

Highway to Heaven
After producing both "Little House" and later the Father Murphy TV series, Landon starred in another successful program. In Highway to Heaven, he played a probationary angel (who named himself Jonathan Smith) whose job was to help people in order to earn his wings. His co-star on the show was Victor French (who had previously co-starred on Landon's Little House on the Prairie) as ex-cop Mark Gordon. On Highway, Landon served as executive producer, writer, and director. Highway to Heaven was the only show throughout his long career in television that he owned outright.

By 1985, prior to hiring his son, Michael Landon Jr., as a member of his camera crew, he also brought real-life cancer patients and disabled people to the set. His decision to work with disabled people led him to hire a couple of adults with disabilities to write episodes for Highway to Heaven.

By season four, Highway dropped out of the Nielsen top 30, and in June 1988, NBC announced that the series would return for an abbreviated fifth season, which would be its last. Its final episodes were filmed in the fall of 1988. One aired in September, two in December, one in March 1989, and the remainder aired on Fridays from June to August. French did not live to see Highway series finale broadcast; he died of advanced lung cancer on June 15, 1989, two months after it was diagnosed. Landon invited his youngest daughter, Jennifer Landon, to take part in the final episode.

Other projects

In 1972, he was among the guests in David Winters' musical television special The Special London Bridge Special, starring Tom Jones, and Jennifer O'Neill.

In 1973, Landon was an episode director and writer for the short-lived NBC romantic anthology series Love Story. In 1982, he co-produced an NBC "true story" television movie, Love Is Forever, starring himself and Laura Gemser (who was credited as Moira Chen), about Australian photojournalist John Everingham's successful attempt to scuba dive under the Mekong to rescue his lover from communist-ruled Laos in 1977. The real Everingham was cast as an extra in the film.

Sam's Son was a 1984 coming-of-age feature film written and directed by Landon and loosely based on his early life. The film stars Timothy Patrick Murphy, Eli Wallach, Anne Jackson, Hallie Todd, and James Karen. Karen previously worked for Landon in the made-for-television film Little House: The Last Farewell.

He was a guest of the PBS television series The Electric Company.

After the cancellation of Highway to Heaven and before his move to CBS, Landon wrote and directed the teleplay Where Pigeons Go to Die. Based on a novel of the same name, the film starred Art Carney and was nominated for two Emmy awards.

Up through the run of Highway to Heaven, all of Landon's television programs were broadcast on NBC, a relationship of which lasted thirty consecutive years with the network. After the cancellation of Highway and due to a fallout with those within NBC's upper management, he moved to CBS and in 1991 starred in a two-hour pilot called Us. Us was meant to be another series for Landon but, with his diagnosis on April 5 of pancreatic cancer, the show never aired beyond the pilot. Also during the 1990–91 season, Landon appeared as host of the CBS special America's Missing Children, which explored actual cases of missing children that were under investigation. This special was, as well, being considered as the pilot for a new series.

Landon also appeared as a celebrity panelist on the premiere week of Match Game on CBS.

Singing
Landon also had a singing career, of the teen idol type.

In 1957, Candlelight Records released a Michael Landon single "Gimme a Little Kiss (Will "Ya" Huh)"/ "Be Patient With Me" during the height of his notoriety for his role in the film I Was a Teenage Werewolf. Some copies show the artist credited as the "Teenage Werewolf" rather than as Michael Landon. In 1962, both the A- and B-side of the record were re-released on the Fono-Graf label that included a picture sleeve of Landon's then-current role on Bonanza as Little Joe Cartwright.

In 1964, RCA Victor Records released another Landon single, "Linda Is Lonesome"/"Without You". All of Landon's singles have since been issued on compact disc by Bear Family Records as part of a Bonanza various artists compilation.

Landon sang on television, on the Dean Martin Show, Hullabaloo, and other venues, and also sang live on stage at theatrical venues (sometimes with a holster and gun strapped to his hip).

Personal life
Landon was married three times and was a father to nine children (three of whom were adopted):
 Dodie Levy-Fraser (married 1956; divorced 1962)
 Mark Fraser Landon (adopted; Dodie's biological son) 
 Josh Fraser Landon (adopted as infant)
 Marjorie Lynn Noe (married 1963; divorced 1982) 
 Cheryl Lynn Landon (born Cheryl Ann Pontrelli), Lynn's daughter from her first marriage; she was nine when her mother and Landon married.
 Leslie Ann Landon 
 Michael Landon Jr.
 Shawna Leigh Landon
 Christopher Beau Landon
 Cindy Clerico (married 1983), a makeup artist on Little House on the Prairie
 Jennifer Rachel Landon
 Sean Matthew Landon

In February 1959, Landon's father died from a heart attack. In 1973, his eldest daughter, Cheryl, and three others were involved in a serious car collision just outside Tucson, Arizona, while a student at the University of Arizona. She was the sole survivor. She was hospitalized with serious injuries and remained in a coma for days. Landon's mother, Peggy, died in March 1981.

Landon admitted to being a chain smoker and heavy drinker.

Landon said in a 1991 interview with The Associated Press, "I believe in God, I believe in family, I believe in truth between people, I believe in the power of love, I believe that we really are created in God’s image, that there is God in all of us."

Illness and death

On April 2, 1991, Landon began to suffer from a severe headache while he was on a skiing vacation in Utah. Three days later, he was diagnosed with a particularly aggressive form of pancreatic cancer known as exocrine adenocarcinoma, which had begun to impact the tissues and blood vessels around his pancreas. The cancer was inoperable and terminal. 

On May 9, he appeared on The Tonight Show Starring Johnny Carson to speak about the cancer and condemn the tabloid press for its sensational headlines and inaccurate stories, including the claim that he and his wife were trying to conceive another child. During his appearance, Landon pledged to fight the disease and asked his fans to pray for him. Twelve days after his appearance on the show, he underwent successful surgery for a near-fatal blood clot in his left leg. In June, he appeared on the cover of Life magazine after granting the periodical an exclusive private interview about his life, his family, and his struggle to live. 

On July 1, at age 54, Landon died in Malibu, California at 1:20 p.m., with his last wife at his bedside. Landon was interred in a private family mausoleum at Hillside Memorial Park Cemetery, in Culver City, California. Landon's headstone reads, "He seized life with joy. He gave to life generously. He leaves a legacy of love and laughter." His son Mark, who died in May 2009, is also interred there.

Legacy

A community building at Malibu's Bluffs Park was named "The Michael Landon Center" following the actor's death. Landon's son, Michael Jr., produced a memorial special called Michael Landon: Memories with Laughter and Love, featuring the actor's family, friends and co-stars: Bonanza co-star David Canary said that one word that described Landon was "fearless" in his dealings with network brass. Melissa Gilbert, who played his daughter on Little House, said that the actor made her feel "incredibly safe" and that he was "paternal". Often cited on the special was Landon's bizarre sense of humor, which included having toads leap from his mouth and dressing as a superhero to visit a pizza parlor.

In 1991, during Landon's final Tonight Show appearance, Johnny Carson related how the actor took him back to a restaurant the two had dined at previously. Carson had been led to believe he accidentally ran over the owner's cat in the parking lot during their first visit. When sitting down to eat the second time, Carson discovered that Landon had helped create a fake menu of dinner items featuring cat metaphors.

A made-for-TV movie, Michael Landon, the Father I Knew, co-written and directed by his son Michael Jr., aired on CBS in May 1999. John Schneider starred in the title role as Michael Landon, with Cheryl Ladd as Lynn Noe and Joel Berti as Michael Landon Jr. The biopic detailed, from Michael Jr.'s point of view, the personal emotional trauma he endured during his parents' divorce and his father's premature death. The movie spanned a timeline from the 1960s through the early 1990s.

A plaque and small playground referred to as the "Little Treehouse on the Prairie" was erected in Knight Park, a central park in Landon's hometown of Collingswood. In 2011, the plaque was removed from the park by the borough and was later given to a local newspaper by an unnamed person. According to the Collingswood, NJ, website, the plaque was removed during a fall cleanup with plans to return it to a safer location. The plaque was reinstated next to a bench in a safer location the following summer.

In 2021, Karen Grassle, Landon's co-star on Little House, published her memoir, Bright Lights, Prairie Dust: Reflections on Life, Loss, and Love by House's Ma.  In the book, Grassle detailed the  troubled relationship she had with Landon, citing derogatory remarks he made about her while on the set of Little House, often with other members of the cast and crew present.  Grassle subsequently "mended fences" with Landon prior to his death in 1991 from pancreatic cancer.

Filmography

Film

Television

Awards and honors

References

External links

Landon Remembrance Project site archived at the Wayback Machine
Michael Landon

1936 births
1991 deaths
20th-century American businesspeople
20th-century American Jews
20th-century American male actors
20th-century American male writers
20th-century American screenwriters
20th-century American singers
American male film actors
American male javelin throwers
American male screenwriters
American male singers
American male television actors
American male television writers
American people of Irish descent
American television directors
American television writers
Burials at Hillside Memorial Park Cemetery
Collingswood High School alumni
Deaths from cancer in California
Deaths from pancreatic cancer
International Emmy Founders Award winners
Jewish American male actors
Jewish American writers
Jewish singers
Male actors from California
Male actors from New Jersey
Male actors from New York City
Male Western (genre) film actors
Michael Landon family
People from Collingswood, New Jersey
People from Forest Hills, Queens
People from the San Fernando Valley
Screenwriters from California
Screenwriters from New Jersey
Screenwriters from New York (state)
Singers from California
Singers from New Jersey
Singers from New York City
Television personalities from California
Television personalities from New York City
Television producers from California
Television producers from New Jersey
Television producers from New York City
Track and field athletes from New York City
University of Southern California alumni
Western (genre) television actors
Writers from Queens, New York